The Union of Conscientiously Work-Shy Elements was an unusually successful frivolous political party in Denmark. It was founded in Aarhus in 1979 by a comedian, Jacob Haugaard (born 1952), and a few friends. Haugaard stood as a candidate in Aarhus in each parliamentary election, until September 1994 when he was very unexpectedly elected to the Folketing with 23,253 personal votes, thereby winning a "kredsmandat" (a locally based seat in parliament).

He made the following promises in the 1994 election:

 Tail winds on all cycle paths
 Better weather 
 Better Christmas presents
 Less sex in school staff rooms (withdrawn during the campaign – he said it had been brought to his attention that sex in the staff room was a long-established privilege for teachers and as such could not be abolished)
 More whales in the fjord of Randers
 The right to impotency
 More Renaissance furniture in IKEA
 8 hours of spare time, 8 hours of rest, 8 hours of sleep (a parody of a popular slogan of the eight-hour day movement: "Eight hours' labour, Eight hours' recreation, Eight hours' rest")
 Nutella in army field rations
 The placing of a public toilet in the park in Aarhus where he spent his state party funding on serving beer and sausages to his voters after each election.
 More bread for the ducks in parks

The last three promises were actually fulfilled during his term in office.

While the party had been intended as a joke, he found himself often having the deciding vote in a hung parliament, and took his duties seriously until the parliamentary election in March 1998. He then announced his retirement from politics.

Quotes
"If work is so healthy, then why not give it to the sick?"
"Work? We can't be bothered. That's what we have the Germans for." (from a song)

References

See also
 List of frivolous parties

Defunct political parties in Denmark
Joke political parties
1979 establishments in Denmark
Political parties established in 1979
Political parties with year of disestablishment missing